is a graduate business school with campuses in Tokyo, Osaka, Nagoya, Fukuoka, Sendai, Yokohama, and Mito in Japan and Singapore, Bangkok, and San Francisco internationally. Globis University started as a private education venture, Globis Management School, in 1992 by Japanese entrepreneur Yoshito Hori, later gaining official university status in 2006. Globis University is Japan's largest graduate business school, with an annual intake of 1,050 MBA students and enrollment of 2,624 students in 2021. 
The university offers part-time and online MBA degree programs in English or Japanese and a full-time degree MBA program in English.

History

GLOBIS Management School
Globis Management School was established as a private, non-accredited business school in Tokyo by Globis Corporation and its founder Yoshito Hori in 1992. It would form the basis for the later establishment of Graduate School of Management, Globis University. Hori, while doing his MBA at Harvard Business School from 1989 until 1991, observed that entrepreneurs in the US had access to a business environment highly conducive to start-ups. Aiming to nurture a similar environment in Japan, he set out to create a business centered around an ecosystem of knowledge, people and capital.

Hori had initially approached his alma mater regarding opening a franchise in Japan but was turned down, leading to the establishment of an independent business school. A licensing agreement was made, however, allowing Harvard case studies to be used at GLOBIS Management School. The school started with 800,000 yen (about $7,000 USD) in capital and a single marketing course taught at a small rented classroom in Shibuya. Additional business subjects such as finance were soon introduced, all structured around the case study method, which was quite novel in Japan at the time. 

In 1993 a campus in Osaka was opened. By 1996 the curriculum had been expanded to allow the establishment of a joint MBA program with the University of Leicester. The first part of the program consisted of classes taught by Globis Management School in Japanese at locations in Tokyo and Osaka or by correspondence. The second part of the program was provided in English by Leicester Business School by correspondence. The joint MBA program would continue until January 2008.

In 2003 the Graduate Diploma in Business Administration (GDBA) was launched, a non-degree program and predecessor to the MBA degree offered after university status was attained. GDBA was discontinued in 2013 with a total of 220 students having graduated.

University Status

Provisions for the establishment of this type of university had been introduced as part of the  previously in 2003. This led to the establishment of the Graduate School of Management, Globis University in April 2006. That same year, university campuses in Tokyo and Osaka were formally established.

However, in 2008 the decision was made to change the incorporation entity of Graduate School of Management, Globis University to a non-profit  . This entity type had traditionally been reserved for organizations with substantial funds and ownership of land for campus development, but became an option for universities established by private companies after MEXT introduced changes to requirements. Changing to an incorporated educational institution allowed Globis University to establish a fund supported by internal reserves and donations, enabling a more stable and long-term development of the educational environment and campus facilities.

Expansion
Further university campus locations were added in Nagoya in 2009, Sendai in 2012, Fukuoka in 2013, and Yokohama and Mito, Ibaraki in 2017. Outside of Japan campus locations were opened in Singapore in 2019, Bangkok in 2020, and San Francisco in 2021.

Campuses

Globis University has five campuses in Tokyo, Osaka, Nagoya, Sendai, and Fukuoka and two  in Yokohama and Mito, Ibaraki in Japan. The main campus is located near Kōjimachi Station in Banchō, Chiyoda in central Tokyo, which offers both Japanese and English-language MBA programs. The Osaka, Nagoya, Sendai, and Fukuoka campuses offer Japanese-language MBA programs. Satellite campuses in Yokohama and Mito only offer non-degree Pre-MBA courses in Japanese.

Outside of Japan Globis University offers non-degree English-language Pre-MBA courses at campus locations in Singapore, Bangkok, and San Francisco.

Academics

Academic programs
Globis University consists of a single graduate school of management. The university offers a one-year Full-time MBA degree program in English, which includes a 3-month professional internship, and two-year Part-time MBA and Online MBA degree programs in either Japanese or English. Preparatory non-degree Pre-MBA courses are also available in both Japanese and English, allowing credits to be transferred upon enrollment in the MBA degree programs.

Accreditation
Globis University is fully accredited by the Japan University Accreditation Association (JUAA), Japan’s higher education accreditation board, under both university and business school categories.

Exchange Partners
Globis University has exchange programs with:
 CEIBS (China Europe International Business School) 
 Chulalongkorn Business School

Student Body

Enrollment

In May 2022, the university had a total enrollment of 2,683 graduate students. The share of English MBA students is 6.3% of the total.

Notable people

Alumni
 Eri Machii – Founder/CEO AfriMedico
 Miko Tan – Co-founder TeamRed
 Wilson Chan – CEO Buyandship

Faculty
James Abegglen
Yoshito Hori

References

External links 
Graduate School of Management, GLOBIS University 
GLOBIS Asia Campus (Singapore) 
GLOBIS Thailand 
GLOBIS USA 
GLOBIS Corporation 
GLOBIS Management School 

Globis
Business schools in Japan
Postgraduate schools
Educational institutions established in 2006
Private universities and colleges in Japan
Universities and colleges in Tokyo
2006 establishments in Japan
Chiyoda, Tokyo